George Kordas, better known by the stage name DJ Bonez, is a hip hop DJ and producer, originally from Sydney and currently based in Melbourne, Australia.

DJ Bonez has been described as being at "the forefront of Australian DJing culture as a performer and also catering to DJs worldwide with break beats and scratch records".

Career
Bonez began creating four-track mix tapes and CDs for the underground hip-hop scene in the late 1980s, while studying at high school. By the age of 17, hands, he had expanded his skills and started performing as a club and scratch DJ in venues across Australia.

In 1995, Bonez made the transition to producer. Having honed his skills as a DJ, he performed turntable trick routines and began producing battle records. By 1997, Bonez had made a name for himself, appearing in a documentary, Basic Equipment, made by Paul Fenech.

In 1999, Bonez started making beats with a group named the Dominion Crew. He also supported groups from the US who toured Australia, including DJing for artists such as Murs, AceyAlone, Diverse and Mr. Liff, amongst others.

Dating back to 2000, DJ Bonez was the DJ for Hyjak N Torcha. He produced their 2004 release Drastik Measures, Bonez' first full-length produced album, which gained national recognition and was the first Australian Hip Hop album to be selected as Triple J album of the week.

Shortly after Muphin and Plutonic Lab formed a partnership under the name Muph & Plutonic in 2004, they toured together with DJ Bonez and Obese Records founder Pegz in 2005, under the collective name Milk Bar Stars. DJ Bonez joined Muph & Plutonic in 2008, appearing on their album And Then Tomorrow Came and touring as an integral part of the band at venues across major cities, regional towns, and at festivals such as the Big Day Out, Homebake, Trackside, Sounds of Spring and Pyramid Rock.

In 2007, Bonez produced Ninja Art, a remix record for Californian-based MC Omni, which also featured various artists including Motion Man, Blade, Speaque Ezie and MC Mell 'O'. Released by Shogun Records, it was named "Best Album of 2007" by the Sydney Morning Herald and gained high-rotation as a feature track on the national Triple J radio network.

That same year, Bonez also released his own solo compilation album through Obese Records, titled Roll Call. This album also featured an array of local artists such as Funkoars, Pegz, Low Budget, Tommy I'llfigga and Muph, and international artists Lotek, Sandpeople, Rainman and Grand Agent. The album debuted at 35 on the ARIA Urban Charts, was named album of the week by JB Hi-Fi, gained high rotation on several radio stations and won that year's award for best compilation from OzHiphop.com. The video clip for the track "Certified" featuring the Funkoars peaked at number 5 on the MTV Video Charts and also picked up the award for best video of 2007 at the OzHiphop.com awards. The video clip for "Roll Call" featuring Sandpeople earned them a feature in Rollingstones.com.

Bonez is also notable for having produced albums and tracks featuring Ozi Batla ("Put it on Wax"), MC Trey (Tapastry Tunes album), Blade, Motion Man, Grand Agent, Mystik Journeyman, and Fraksha, and has also supported many other prominent local and international artists live.

With this reputation, Bonez has been described as "one of Australia's No. #1 live turntable assassins... in the forefront of Australian DJing culture as a performer".

Bonez' website features a section named "The Vault" which contains exclusive tracks, remixes, instrumental and a cappella recordings; however, this content is only available to DJs.

Bonez also performs as a solo DJ in his own right.

Discography

DJ battle records/tools (EP/LP)
 Bone Breaks (1999), Statik Recordings
 Bone Breaks (Australasian Dragon Edition) (2001), Statik Recordings
 Vintage Vandal Breaks (2005), Statik Recordings

Mix tapes/CDs
 Casting Spells on Twelves (CD)
 Hands On Decks (1999) (CD), Statik Recordings
 DJ Bonez Presents the Mamma's Kitchen Mix (2005), Obese Records

Solo albums produced
 Hyjak n Torcha, Drastik Measures (2004), Obese Records
 DJ Bonez ft. various, Roll Call (2007), Obese Records
 Omni, Ninja Art (2007), Statik Recordings/Shogun

Appearances

Production
 Mastermind Alliance | Mass MC (2000) Statik Recordings/Double Beef
 Daily Affirmations | Trey (2000)
 Culture of Kings Volume 1 | Mass MC & Torcha (2000), Obese Records ("Wotcha Say?")
 Culture of Kings Volume 2 | Various (2002), Obese Records ("Face The Music")
 Global Turntables | Various (2002), HHS-024 Hip Hop Slam
 Millenium | Various – UHB5: Legacy 2009 (2002) Outhouse, Revenge Entertainment
 Pro Amateur | Luckyiam.PSC – Extra Credit Assignment No. 1 "The Vehicle" (2002) Outhouse, Revenge Entertainment
 Broken Dream | DJ Skizo (2007) Relief Records EU
 Bias Life | Bias B (2011)

References

External links
Official website

Australian DJs
Living people
Obese Records artists
Year of birth missing (living people)